is a Japanese 1980s pink film actress and bondage and fetish model who is best known for being the 4th Nikkatsu SM Queen in 1983.

Career
By 1980, Nami Matsukawa was a sex worker named "Emi" at the SM club Blue Chateau in Akasaka, Tokyo. Matsukawa made her Nikkatsu debut with Masaru Konuma's 1982 Slave Contract (奴隷契約書), to be later promoted as the fourth  following Naomi Tani, Junko Mabuki, and Izumi Shima. She also performed as a bondage model for nawashi Hiroshi Urado in the SM Fairy Nami Matsukawa (SMの妖精・松川ナミ) series of Nikkatsu Video in 1982. Her girl-next door quality made her popular with audiences, but SM-author Oniroku Dan complained that, unlike the buxom Naomi Tani, Matsukawa was not fleshy enough to be an appealing bondage subject in his films. Rope and Breasts of Konuma was Matsukawa's farewell appearance as the Nikkatsu SM Queen and she was replaced by Miki Takakura after a brief "reign".

Filmography

Videos

Bibliography

References

External links 
 
 Nami Matsukawa at the JMDB

1961 births
Pink film actors
Japanese female adult models
Nikkatsu SM Queens
People from Hamamatsu
Living people